Ust-Zagan is a rural locality (a selo) in Bichursky District, Republic of Buryatia, Russia. The population was 32 as of 2010. There is 1 street.

Geography 
Ust-Zagan is located 34 km northeast of Bichura (the district's administrative centre) by road. Uzky Lug is the nearest rural locality.

References 

Rural localities in Bichursky District